Research data indicates that steroids affect the serotonin and dopamine neurotransmitter systems of the brain. In an animal study, male rats developed a conditioned place preference to testosterone injections into the nucleus accumbens, an effect blocked by dopamine antagonists, which suggests that androgen reinforcement is mediated by the brain. Moreover, testosterone appears to act through the mesolimbic dopamine system, a common substrate for addictive substances. Nonetheless, androgen reinforcement is not comparable to that of cocaine, nicotine, or heroin. Instead, testosterone resembles other mild reinforcers, such as caffeine, or benzodiazepines. The potential for androgen addiction remains to be determined.

Anabolic steroids are not psychoactive and cannot be detected by stimuli devices like a pupilometer which makes them hard to spot as a source of neuropsychological imbalances in some AAS users.

Dependence potential
The Diagnostic Statistical Manual IV (DSM IV) and the International Classification of Diseases, Volume 10 (ICD-10) differ in the way they regard Anabolic-Androgenic Steroids' (AAS) potential for producing dependence.

DSM IV regards AAS as potentially dependence producing. ICD-10, however, regards them as non-dependence producing. Anabolic steroids are not physically addictive but users can develop a psychological dependence on the physical result.

Diagnostic Statistical Manual
For DSM-IV, anabolic-androgenic steroid dependency is found in the "other substance-related disorder" (which includes inhalants, anabolic steroids, medications) section and can be coded, depending on which diagnostic criteria are met.

International Classification of Diseases 
ICD–10 criteria for dependence include experience of at least three of the following during the past year:
 a strong desire to take steroids
 difficulty in controlling the use
 withdrawal syndrome when use is reduced
 evidence of tolerance
 neglect of other interests and persistent use despite harmful consequences

However, the following ICD-10-CM Index entries contain back-references to ICD-10-CM F55.3:
Abuse
hormones F55.5
steroids F55.5
drug NEC (non-dependent) F19.10
hormones F55.5
steroids F55.5
non-psychoactive substance NEC F55.8
hormones F55.5
steroids F55.5

ICD-10 goes on to state that "although it is usually clear that the patient has a strong motivation to take the substance, there is no development of dependence or withdrawal symptoms as in the case of the psychoactive substances."

National Institute on Drug Abuse
The National Institute on Drug Abuse (NIDA) says that "even though anabolic steroids do not cause the same high as other drugs, steroids are reinforcing and can lead to addiction. Studies have shown that animals will self-administer steroids when given the opportunity, just as they do with other addictive drugs. People may persist in abusing steroids despite physical problems and negative effects on social relationships, reflecting these drugs' addictive potential. Also, people who use anabolic steroids typically spend large amounts of time and money obtaining the drug; another indication of addiction. Individuals who use anabolic steroids can experience withdrawal symptoms when they stop taking them, including mood swings, fatigue, restlessness, loss of appetite, insomnia, reduced sex drive, and steroid cravings, all of which may contribute to continued use. One of the most dangerous withdrawal symptoms is depression. When depression is persistent, it can sometimes lead to suicidal thoughts. Research has found that some people who use anabolic steroids turn to other substances such as opioids to counteract the negative effects of steroids."

Causes and treatment
Males who use anabolic androgenic steroids often have a troubled social background.

Childhood trauma
25% of male weightlifters reported memories of childhood physical or sexual abuse in an interview. Anabolic steroids are sometimes used by people with muscle dysmorphia (a specific type of body dysmorphic disorder (BDD)) as a defense mechanism. Yohimbine (a common pre-workout ingredient), although it fails to increase testosterone levels as had at first been suspected, has at higher doses been discovered to be useful in facilitating recall of traumatic memories during post traumatic stress disorder (PTSD) treatment that can be used in conjunction with exposure therapy.

Illicit use by groups

Criminals
Anabolic steroid use has been associated with an antisocial lifestyle involving various types of criminality.

Governments

Law enforcement
Steroid abuse among law enforcement is considered a problem by some. "It's a big problem, and from the number of cases, it's something we shouldn't ignore. It's not that we set out to target cops, but when we're in the middle of an active investigation into steroids, there have been quite a few cases that have led back to police officers," says Lawrence Payne, a spokesman for the United States Drug Enforcement Administration. The FBI Law Enforcement Bulletin stated that "Anabolic steroid abuse by police officers is a serious problem that merits greater awareness by departments across the country".  It is also believed that police officers across the United Kingdom "are using criminals to buy steroids and abuse their power for sexual gratification" which he claims to be a top risk factor for police corruption.

Sports

Professional wrestling

Following the resurgence of Bill Graham, the Oversight and Government Reform Committee investigated steroid usage in the wrestling industry. The Committee investigated WWE and Total Nonstop Action Wrestling (TNA), asking for documentation of their companies' drug policies. WWE CEO and Chairman, Linda and Vince McMahon respectively, both testified. The documents stated that 75 wrestlers—roughly 40 percent—had tested positive for drug use since 2006, most commonly for steroids.

Students

Middle school 
According to a 1998 study, 2.7% of middle school students admitted to taking steroids. 2% of non-users indicated they would use them in the future.

Side effects 
There are heavy physiological side effects that affect the human body upon using anabolic steroids. Both men and women can use androgenic (testosterone) hormones and experience the repercussions. There are "Male Specific", "Female Specific", Universal, Physical, Injection related, and Psychological side effects that occur from anabolic steroid use.

Male specific side effects 
These side effects pertain to males which include:

 Male breast enlargement
 Shrunken testicles
 Decreased sperm count to the point of sterility or infertility
 Impotence
 An enlarged prostate
 Low back pain
 Water retention.

Female specific side effects 
These side effects pertain to females which include:

 Breast shrinkage
 Facial hair growth
 Extreme clitoral enlargement
 Menstrual irregularity (such as late periods, or lack thereof)

Universal side effects 
These side effects can happen to any people of any sex. They are broken down into three categories which are the Physical, Injection related, and Psychological side effects.

Physical side effects 
Side effects that men and women experience physically include:

 Decreased libido
 Deepened voice
 Headaches
 Kidney pain
 General skin infections and skin tearing
 Striae
 Alopecia
 Severe acne on the face and back
 Urticaria
 Liver disease
 Kidney damage
 Gastrointestinal distress
 Eczema
 Increased heart size

Injection side effects 
Common side effects of anabolic steroid use via injection include:

 Neurovascular injury (damage to blood vessels and nerve clusters)
 Hematoma
 Fibrosis
 Bacterial infection
 Hepatitis B or C
 HIV infection.

Psychological side effects 
Anabolic steroid abuse can affect one's psyche, regardless of gender. Psychological damages from abuse include:

 Psychological dependence and addiction
 Mood swings
 Short-term personality changes during periods of increased use
 Increased aggression
 Paranoia
 Mania
 Delusions of grandeur
 Psychosis
 Irrational thoughts and behavior
 Memory loss
 Panic attacks

Note that all of these side effects of anabolic steroid use may or may not occur. Side effects occur because of hormonal imbalances. Non-direct reasonings for steroid use for sports can also stem from the low positive dope tests that occur before an event. When competition is at an all-time high, the incentive to use steroids becomes that much easier as sports events do not have a just way to provide fool-proof drug tests.

References 

Androgens and anabolic steroids
Substance-related disorders